Luisa Kuliok  (b. Buenos Aires, 20 March 1953) is an Argentine actress of theater, film and television.

Career
From the age of five, she studied acting and did her first play in a school production when the lead was sick. Later, she studied with Agustín Alezzo and in 1976, the same year she married, she had her professional debut. Kuliok is often credited as being the first international Argentine telenovela star. Her work in La extraña dama in 1989 was shown, became a hit in Italy and opened doors for the Argentine industry to expand into new markets. It also led to her being offered a role in Más allá del horizonte (Beyond the Horizon) replacing Gina Lollobrigida. Kuliok worked primarily in television and telenovelas until 1994. The economic crisis that occurred in the ten years between 1994 and 2004 caused her to branch out into other entertainment venues. In 2006, she was nominated for an ACE Award for her role in the theater production of Del Antiguo Oriente and in 2010, she was nominated for her performance in El alma inmoral.

Filmography

Films
 1977: Saverio el cruel 
 1982: Esto es vida
 1987: Revancha de un amigo
 2001: Ciudad del sol
 2012: Amor a mares 
 2014: Death in Buenos Aires 
 2015: Primavera

Television
 1968: Hay que matar a Drácula
 1978: Renato
 1979: Drácula 
 1979: Una escalera al cielo
 1980: Los hermanos Torterolo
 1982: Teatro de humor  Episode: Su desconsolada esposa
 1982: Gracias Doctor
 1982: Un hombre como vos
 1982: Amor Gitano
 1982: Juan sin nombre
 1982: Ciclo Unitario 
 1984: Amo y señor
 1986: El infiel
 1986: Venganza de mujer
 1987: Como la hiedra
 1989: La extraña dama
 1991: Renzo e Lucia
 1991 - 1992: Cosecharás tu siembra
 1992: La donna del mistero 2
 1992: Soy Gina
 1993: Milagros
 1994: Senza peccato
 1994: Más allá del horizonte
 1994: Con alma de tango
 2000: Tiempo final - Episode: Infieles
 2001: Los médicos
 2002: Ciudad de pobres corazones
 2008: Mujeres de nadie 
 2008: Mujeres Asesinas 4 - Chapter 3: Marta, manipuladora
 2013: Solamente vos

Live performances

Theater
 1976: Tiempo de vivir
 1976: Despertar de primavera
 1978: Nuestro pueblo 
 1979: La visita que no tocó el timbre 
 1983: Los japoneses no esperan 
 1985: Comedia romántica
 1996: La fierecilla domada 
 1997: Dos damas indignas
 1998: Dos damas indignas
 1999: Dos damas indignas
 2001: Che madame 
 2002: Sabor a Freud
 2003: La mesita de luz 
 2004: Porteñas 
 2004: La traiciòn del recuerdo
 2005: Porteñas 
 2005: La mesita de luz
 2006: El Collar de la Paloma
 2007: El Collar de la Paloma
 2008: El Collar de la Paloma
 2009: El hombre inesperado
 2010: El Alma Inmoral
 2011: Hamlet
 2014: Familia de mujeres
 2015: Las obreras

References

External links 
 
 Nuestros Actores

1953 births
Living people
Actresses from Buenos Aires
Argentine television actresses
Argentine film actresses
Argentine stage actresses
20th-century Argentine actresses
21st-century Argentine actresses